Nils Blumberg (born 2 January 1997) is a German former footballer who played as a forward.

Career
Blumberg made his professional debut for Chemnitzer FC in the 3. Liga on 28 July 2019, coming on as a substitute in the 65th minute for Pascal Itter in the 3–2 away loss against Viktoria Köln.

References

External links
 
 

1997 births
Living people
Footballers from Berlin
German footballers
Association football forwards
Hertha BSC II players
Chemnitzer FC players
Alemannia Aachen players
3. Liga players
Regionalliga players